Declan Joseph McManus (born 3 August 1994) is a Scottish professional footballer, who plays as a forward for The New Saints. McManus has previously played for Aberdeen, Fleetwood Town, Greenock Morton, Alloa Athletic, Raith Rovers, Dunfermline Athletic, Ross County and Falkirk.

Career

Aberdeen
McManus made his debut for Aberdeen's first team on 28 April 2012, coming on as a substitute in a 3–0 defeat to Dunfermline Athletic. In the new season, McManus goalscoring form in the U20 league caught the eye of Dundee and Partick Thistle, who were keen to sign him on loan. In November 2012, McManus signed a new contract with the club that will keep him until 2015.

On 31 July 2013 McManus joined Alloa Athletic on a six-month loan deal. McManus made his first ever senior start in Alloa Athletic's 2–0 win in the League Cup First Round fixture against Peterhead. On 14 December 2013, McManus scored his first senior goal in Alloa's 2–0 win against Greenock Morton.

McManus moved on loan to Scottish League One club Greenock Morton on 8 August 2014. He scored his first ever senior hat-trick in a 5–2 cup victory over Berwick Rangers in August 2014, and left the club at the end of his loan spell having scored 12 goals in 21 starts. On 2 February 2015, McManus joined Greenock Morton for a second loan spell, signing until the end of the 2014–15 season. McManus was nominated for the SPFA League One player of the year for 2014–15, as well as being included in the League One Team of the Year with teammate Mark Russell. He won the Player of the Year award.

Fleetwood Town
On 15 May 2015, McManus signed a pre-contract agreement with Fleetwood Town. On 31 December 2015, McManus returned for his third loan spell with Morton. In July 2016, McManus returned to Scotland, joining Scottish Championship side Raith Rovers on loan. In May 2017 he left Fleetwood at the end of his contract

Dunfermline Athletic
McManus returned north to Scotland in June 2017, signing for Scottish Championship side Dunfermline Athletic on a one-year deal.

Ross County
McManus signed for Ross County in June 2018 and was loaned to Falkirk on 16 July 2019. McManus was released by County in May 2020, following the end of his contract.

Dunfermline return
Following his release from County, McManus re-signed for Dunfermline Athletic on 10 July 2020, joining the club on a two-year deal.

The New Saints
After one season with Dunfermline, McManus moved to Cymru Premier club The New Saints on 14 June 2021, for a fee of £60,000.

International career
Having represented Scotland in U18 and U19 Levels, McManus was called up for the U21 squad.

Career statistics

Honours

Greenock Morton
Scottish League One: 2014–15

Ross County
Scottish Championship: 2018–19
Scottish Challenge Cup: 2018–19

The New Saints
Cymru Premier: 2021–22

Individual
PFA Scotland League One Player of the Year: 2014–2015
PFA Scotland League One Team of the Year: 2014–2015
Greenock Telegraph Player of the Year: 2014–15
SPFL Championship Player of the Month: February 2016

References

External links

1994 births
Living people
Association football forwards
Scottish footballers
Aberdeen F.C. players
Scottish Premier League players
Alloa Athletic F.C. players
Greenock Morton F.C. players
Raith Rovers F.C. players
Fleetwood Town F.C. players
Dunfermline Athletic F.C. players
Ross County F.C. players
Falkirk F.C. players
The New Saints F.C. players
Scottish Professional Football League players
Scotland youth international footballers
Footballers from Glasgow
Scotland under-21 international footballers
English Football League players
Cymru Premier players